Carcinonemertidae is a family of worms belonging to the order Hoplonemertea.

Genera:
 Carcinonemertes Coe, 1902
 Ovicides Shields, 2001
 Pseudocarcinonemertes Fleming & Gibson, 1981

References

Monostilifera
Nemertea families